Limousine Life is a lost 1918 silent film comedy directed by John F. Dillon and starring Olive Thomas. It was produced and distributed by Triangle Film Corporation.

Cast
Olive Thomas - Minnie Wills
Lee Phelps - Moncure Kelts
Joseph Bennett - Jed Bronson
Lillian West - Gertrude Muldane
Virginia Foltz - Miss Wilkins
Alberta Lee - Mrs. Wills
Lottie De Vaull - Mrs. Malvin
Lillian Langdon - Mrs. Kelts
Harry L. Rattenberry - Mr. Wills
Jules Friquet - Jasper Bronson

References

External links

 lobby poster

1918 films
American silent feature films
American black-and-white films
Films directed by John Francis Dillon
Lost American films
Triangle Film Corporation films
Silent American comedy films
1918 comedy films
1918 lost films
Lost comedy films
1910s American films